The 2017–18 Drexel Dragons men's basketball team represented Drexel University during the 2017–18 NCAA Division I men's basketball season. The Dragons, led by second-year head coach Zach Spiker, played their home games at the Daskalakis Athletic Center in Philadelphia, Pennsylvania as members of the Colonial Athletic Association. They finished the season 13–20, 6–12 in CAA play to finish in a four-way tie for seventh place. They defeated James Madison in the first round of the CAA tournament before losing in the quarterfinals to College of Charleston.

On February 22, 2018, the Dragons set the record for the greatest comeback in Division I basketball history when they overcame a 34-point defect (trailing 53–19 at one point) to beat Delaware 85–83.

Previous season

The Dragons finished the 2016–17 season 9–23,  3–15 in CAA play to finish in 10th place. They lost to James Madison in the CAA tournament.

Offseason

Departures

Incoming transfers

2017 recruiting class

Class of 2018 early commitments

Preseason 
In a poll of the league coaches, media relations directors, and media members at the CAA's media day, Drexel was picked to finish in ninth place in the CAA. Sophomore guard Kurk Lee was named to the preseason All-CAA second team.

Roster

Schedule and results

|-
!colspan=12 style=| Exhibition
|-

|-
!colspan=12 style=| Non-conference regular season
|-

|-
!colspan=12 style=| CAA regular season
|-

|-
!colspan=12 style=| CAA Tournament
|-

Team statistics
As of the end of the season. 
 Indicates team leader in each category. 
(FG%, FT% leader = minimum 50 att.; 3P% leader = minimum 20 att.)

Awards
Tramaine Isabell
Team Most Valuable Player
CAA All-Conference Second Team
2017 Paradise Jam All-Tournament Team
CAA Player of the Week (3)

Austin Williams
"Sweep" Award (team leader in blocks)
Dragon "D" Award (team's top defensive player)
CAA All-Defensive Team

Jarvis Doles
CAA Rookie of the Week

Kurk Lee
Assist Award (team leader in assists)
Preseason CAA All-Conference Second Team

Tim Perry Jr
Samuel D. Cozen Award (most improved player)

Troy Harper
Donald Shank Spirit & Dedication Award

Alihan Demir
Team Academic Award

See also
 2017–18 Drexel Dragons women's basketball team

References

Drexel Dragons men's basketball seasons
Drexel
Drexel
Drexel